Arthur Edward Jones, Jr. (June 13, 1919 — August 29, 1995) was a professional American football defensive back in the National Football League (NFL). He played two seasons for the Pittsburgh Steelers (1941, 1945). After playing college football for Richmond, he was drafted by the Philadelphia Eagles in the second round (11th overall) of the 1941 NFL Draft. His rights were transferred to the Steelers due to the events later referred to as the Pennsylvania Polka. He served in World War II for the United States Navy before rejoining the Steelers in 1945. He played for the Richmond Rebels of the Dixie League in 1946.

In 1975, Jones was inducted into the Virginia Sports Hall of Fame.

References

Further reading

1919 births
1995 deaths
Sportspeople from Suffolk, Virginia
Players of American football from Virginia
American football halfbacks
American football defensive backs
Richmond Spiders football players
North Carolina Pre-Flight Cloudbusters football players
Pittsburgh Steelers players
United States Navy personnel of World War II